This is the discography of Blackbear (Matthew Tyler Musto), an American singer, songwriter, and record producer.

Albums

Studio albums

Mixtapes

EPs

Singles

As lead artist

As featured artist

Promotional singles

Other charted and certified songs

Guest appearances

Writing, production and feature credits

With Polaroid

Albums

EPs

With Hotel Motel

With Mansionz

Notes

References

Discographies of American artists
Hip hop discographies